Hemihoplitidae is an extinct family of ammonoid cephalopods belonging to the superfamily Ancyloceratoidea. Fossils of species within this genus have been found in the Cretaceous rocks of southeastern France, Mexico, Slovakia, South Africa and Trinidad and Tobago.

Genera
 Gassendiceras Bert, Delanoy & Bersac, 2006
 Hemihoplites Spath, 1924

References

Ancyloceratoidea
Ammonitida families
Cretaceous ammonites
Valanginian first appearances
Early Cretaceous extinctions